Tirana 10 is one of the 11 administrative units in Tirana, Albania.

See also
 Tirana
 Administrative units of Tirana

References